In differential geometry, the Carathéodory conjecture is a mathematical conjecture attributed to Constantin Carathéodory by Hans Ludwig Hamburger in a session of the Berlin Mathematical Society in 1924. Carathéodory did publish a paper on a related subject, but never committed the conjecture into writing. In, John Edensor Littlewood mentions the conjecture and Hamburger's contribution as an example of a mathematical claim that is easy to state but difficult to prove. Dirk Struik describes in  the formal analogy of the conjecture with the Four Vertex Theorem for plane curves. Modern references to the conjecture are the problem list of Shing-Tung Yau, the books of Marcel Berger,  as well as the books.

Mathematical content
The conjecture claims that any convex, closed and sufficiently smooth surface in three dimensional Euclidean space needs to admit at least two umbilic points. In the sense of the conjecture, the spheroid with only two umbilic points and the sphere, all points of which are umbilic, are examples of surfaces with minimal and maximal numbers of the umbilicus. For the conjecture to be well posed, or the umbilic points to be well-defined,  the surface needs to be at least twice differentiable.

Mathematical research on an approach by a local umbilic index estimate for real analytic surfaces

The invited address of Stefan Cohn-Vossen  to the International Congress of Mathematicians of 1928  in Bologna was on the subject and in the 1929 edition of Wilhelm Blaschke's third volume on Differential Geometry he states:

While this book goes into print, Mr. Cohn-Vossen has succeeded in proving that closed real-analytic surfaces do not have umbilic points of index > 2 (invited talk at the ICM in Bologna 1928). This proves the conjecture of Carathéodory for such surfaces, namely that they need to have at least two umbilics.

Here Blaschke's index is twice the usual definition for an index of an umbilic point, and the global conjecture follows by the Poincaré–Hopf index theorem. No paper was submitted by Cohn-Vossen to the proceedings of the International Congress, while in later editions of Blaschke's book the above comments were removed. It is, therefore, reasonable to assume that this work was inconclusive.

For analytic surfaces, an affirmative answer to this conjecture  was given in 1940 by Hans Hamburger in a long paper published in three parts. The approach of Hamburger was also via a local index estimate for isolated umbilics, which he had shown to imply the conjecture in his earlier work. In 1943, a shorter proof was proposed by Gerrit Bol, see also, but, in 1959, Tilla Klotz found and corrected a gap in Bol's proof in. Her proof, in turn, was announced to be incomplete in Hanspeter Scherbel's dissertation (no results of that dissertation related to the Carathéodory conjecture were published for decades, at least nothing was published up to June 2009). Among other publications we refer to papers.

All the proofs mentioned above are based on Hamburger's reduction of the Carathéodory conjecture to the following conjecture: the index of every isolated umbilic point is never greater than one. Roughly speaking, the main difficulty lies in the resolution of singularities generated by umbilical points. All the above-mentioned authors resolve the singularities by induction on 'degree of degeneracy' of the umbilical point, but none of them was able to present the induction process clearly.

In 2002, Vladimir Ivanov revisited the work of Hamburger on analytic surfaces with the following stated intent:

"First, considering analytic surfaces, we assert with full responsibility that Carathéodory was right. Second, we know how this can be proved rigorously. Third, we intend to exhibit here a proof which, in our opinion, will convince every reader who is really ready to undertake a long and tiring journey with us."

First he follows the way passed by Gerrit Bol and Tilla Klotz, but later he proposes his own way for singularity resolution where crucial role belongs to complex analysis (more precisely, to techniques involving analytic implicit functions, Weierstrass preparation theorem, Puiseux series, and circular root systems).

Mathematical research on the original global conjecture for smooth surfaces

In 2008, Guilfoyle and Klingenberg announced a proof of the global conjecture for surfaces of smoothness , which has remained unpublished as of 2023. Their method uses neutral Kähler geometry of the Klein quadric to define an associated Riemann-Hilbert boundary value problem, and then applies mean curvature flow and the Sard–Smale Theorem on regular values of Fredholm operators to prove a contradiction for a surface with a single umbilic point. 

In particular, the boundary value problem seeks to find a holomorphic curve with boundary lying on the Lagrangian surface in the Klein quadric determined by the normal lines to the surface in Euclidean 3-space. Previously it was proven that the number of isolated umbilic points contained on the surface in  determines the Keller-Maslov class of the boundary curve  and therefore, when the problem is Fredholm regular, determines the dimension of the space of holomorphic disks. All of the geometric quantities referred to are defined with respect to the canonical neutral Kähler structure, for which surfaces can be both holomorphic and Lagrangian.

By Fredholm regularity, for a generic convex surface close to a putative counter-example of the global Carathéodory Conjecture, the associated Riemann-Hilbert problem would have no solutions. The second step of the proof is to show that such solutions always exist, thus concluding the non-existence of a counter-example. This is done using co-dimension 2 mean curvature flow with boundary. While the complete second step of the proof has not been published as of January 2022, the required interior estimates for higher codimensional mean curvature flow in an indefinite geometry have appeared in print. The final part is the establishment of sufficient boundary control under mean curvature flow to ensure weak convergence.

In 2012 the proof was announced of a weaker version of the local index conjecture for smooth surfaces, namely that an isolated umbilic must have index less than or equal to 3/2. The proof follows that of the global conjecture, but also uses more topological methods, in particular, replacing hyperbolic umbilic points by totally real cross-caps in the boundary of the associated Riemann-Hilbert problem. It leaves open the possibility of a smooth (non-real analytic by Hamburger) convex surface with an isolated umbilic of index 3/2. The proof by similar methods of a conjecture of Toponogov regarding umbilic points on complete planes was announced in 2020. As of 2023, none of these results have been published.

In 2012, Mohammad Ghomi and Ralph Howard showed, using a Möbius transformation, that the global conjecture for surfaces of smoothness  can be reformulated in terms of the number of umbilic points on graphs subject to certain asymptotics of the gradient.

See also
 Differential geometry of surfaces
 Second fundamental form
 Principal curvature
 Umbilical point

References

Conjectures
Unsolved problems in geometry
Differential geometry of surfaces